Abisara dewitzi is a butterfly in the family Riodinidae. It is found in the Democratic Republic of the Congo (Sankuru, Lomami and Lualaba), north-western Zambia and possibly Angola. The habitat consists of forests.

The larvae probably feed on Maesa species.

References

Butterflies described in 1899
Abisara
Butterflies of Africa
Taxa named by Per Olof Christopher Aurivillius